(born January 10, 1973 in Kyoto) is a retired male butterfly swimmer from Japan, who represented his native country at the 1992 Summer Olympics. His best result in three starts in Barcelona, Spain was the fifth place (1:58.97) in the Men's 200m Butterfly event.

References
 sports-reference

1973 births
Living people
Olympic swimmers of Japan
Swimmers at the 1992 Summer Olympics
Japanese male butterfly swimmers
20th-century Japanese people